This is a list of notable high-voltage direct-current power transmission projects.

HVDC projects for long-distance transmission have two (or rarely, more) converter stations and a transmission line interconnecting them.  Generally overhead lines are used for interconnection, but an important class of HVDC projects use submarine power cables. A back-to-back station has no transmission line and connects two AC grids at different frequencies or phase counts. Historical HVDC systems used the Thury system of motor-generators but these have all been made obsolete by later developments such as mercury-arc valves (now also obsolete), thyristors, and IGBT power transistors.

Legend
Line type:
 Thury = Series-connected generators as designed by René Thury
 Merc = Mercury-arc valve rectifier and inverter
 Thyr = Thyristor rectifier and inverter
 IGBT = Insulated Gate Bipolar Transistors

Line status:

Africa

Australia and Oceania

Asia

Europe

2 As of 9 December 2015, LitPol Link started trial operations.
3 Caithness Moray HVDC serves a number of renewable energy sources in the north of Scotland  - see map 
4 Contracts due to be placed in 2016. 
5 Elia says construction expected to start in late 2017.
6 Date is that quoted to support the Shetland Wind Farm that SSE is a part investor in.
7 Decision on project expected in 2017 following consultation - see SSE PD reference.

North America

South America

Back to back

Maps

Europe

Shetland HVDC Connection
Caithness Moray HVDC
Western Isles HVDC connection
NorthConnect
North Sea Link: Kvilldal, Norway – Blyth, UK
Eastern HVDC Link
 Moyle: Auchencrosh, UK – Ballycronan More, Northern Ireland, UK
Western HVDC Link
East–West Interconnector: Leinster, Ireland – Shotton, Wales, UK
Celtic Interconnector
FAB Link
IFA-2
HVDC Cross-Channel: Les Mandarins, France – Sellindge, UK
Nemo Link 
BritNed: UK – Netherlands
Aachen Liège Electricity Grid Overlay (ALEGrO)
Viking Link
HVDC DolWin1, HVDC DolWin2, HVDC DolWin3
HVDC SylWin1
HVDC HelWin1, HVDC HelWin2
HVDC BorWin1, HVDC BorWin2, HVDC BorWin3
NorNed: Feda, Norway – Eemshaven, Netherlands
NORD.LINK: Germany – Norway
Skagerrak 1, 2, 3, and 4: Tjele, Denmark – Kristiansand, Norway
Konti-Skan 1 and 2: VesterHassing, Denmark – Stenkullen, Sweden
StoreBælt: Fyn, Denmark – Zealand, Denmark
Baltic Cable: Lübeck- Herrenwyk, Germany – Kruseberg, Sweden
Kontek: Bjæverskov, Denmark – Bentwisch, Germany
SydVästlänken 
SwePol: Stärnö, Sweden – Wierzbięcin (Słupsk), Poland
LitPol Link
NordBalt 
HVDC Visby–Näs 
Gotland: Västervik, Sweden – Ygne, Sweden
Fenno-Skan: Rauma, Finland – Dannebo, Sweden, Fenno-Skan 2
ÅL-link
Estlink: Harku, Estonia – Espoo, Finland
Estlink 2
Cometa: Valencia, Spain – Mallorca, Spain
 INELFE
HVDC Italy–Corsica–Sardinia: "SACOI" – Codrongianos, Sardinia, Italy – Lucciana, Corsica, France – Suvereto, Italy (mainland)
SAPEI, Sardinia – Italian mainland
 HVDC MON.ITA Project
HVDC Italy-Greece: Arachthos, Greece – Galatina, Italy
EuroAsia Interconnector
EuroAfrica Interconnector
Greenlink

See also
 Asian Super Grid
 Desertec
 Electrode line
 European super grid
 High-voltage direct current
 List of high voltage underground and submarine cables
 Lyon-Moutiers DC transmission scheme
 Scotland-Norway interconnector
 HVDC converter station
 Super grid
 Submarine power cable
 Transmission tower
 Uno Lamm
 Valve hall

References

Sources